Emilio Arenales Catalán (May 10, 1922 – April 17, 1969) was the foreign minister of Guatemala from 1966 to 1969 and the president of the United Nations Twenty-Third General Assembly from 1968 to 1969. He was born and died in Guatemala City.

Biography
Arenales was born in Guatemala City. He held the degrees of Bachelor of Science and Letters from the Instituto Modelo in Guatemala City (1932–1949) and Juridical Science from the Universidad de San Carlos de Guatemala (1940–1945).

Arenales was married in 1946 to the former Lucy Dorion Cabarrus. They had four children: Rodrigo Arenales Dorion (1947–2002), Álvaro Arenales Dorion (b. 1949), María de la Luz Arenales de Aycinena (b. 1950) and María de los Ángeles Arenales de Willemsen (b. 1953).

Achievements at the United Nations
The following list details Catalán's major achievements during his time with the U.N.

1946: Associated with the United Nations Educational, Scientific and Cultural Organization (UNESCO).

1946: Founder and Head of Division of Relations of the United Nations and its specialized agencies.

1946-1948: Legal Counselor to the UNESCO Preparatory Commission.

1946-1949: Deputy Head of Section of External Relations and External Relations Counselor for UNESCO.

1947: UNESCO Deputy Head of Mission to Latin America, together with Sir Julian Huxley and Professor Samuel Ramos. The mission intended to visit each Latin American country and invite them to participate in the first UNESCO General Conference.

1947: Secretary Assistant to the External Relations Commission and Administrative Affairs at the I UNESCO General Conference, México.

1948: Proposed the plan to organize the National Commissions of the member countries, based on the experience of the League of Nations and the International Institute of Intellectual Cooperation. When the plan was accepted, he was named Emissary to UNESCO, and visited a number of Latin American countries, promoting the creation and/or reorganization of National Commissions.

1948: UNESCO representative before the IX Pan-American Conference, Bogotá, Colombia.

1948: UNESCO Head of Latin American Mission.

1948: Secretary-General of the UNESCO International Conference of the Hylean Amazon, which met in Lima, Perú and Manaus, Brazil, having previously visited the participating governments in order to ensure their support and cooperation.

1948: UNESCO General Secretary at the Regional Conference on Scientific Cooperation, Montevideo, Uruguay.

1948: Secretary of External Relations Commission and Administrative Affairs at the II UNESCO General Assembly, Beirut, Lebanon.

1949-1954: Returned to Guatemala and engaged in private law practice.

1954-1955: Attended the IX and X United Nations General Assembly as Delegate to the fifth and sixth sessions of the United Nations Committee on Non-Self-Governing Territories, in charge of the fourth commission, Colonial Affairs.

1955-1958: Ambassador and Permanent Representative of Guatemala to the United Nations.

1955: Vice-President of the United Nations Committee on Non-Self-Governing Territories.

1955: Guatemalan United Nations representative at the Special Session of the General Assembly, to commemorate its 10th anniversary, San Francisco, California.

1955: Chief of the Guatemalan Delegation before the X United Nations General Assembly, Commission of Private Affairs.

1956: Chief of the Guatemalan Delegation before the XI United Nations General Assembly; elected Chairman of the Commission for Political Affairs.

1956: Appointed President of the Financial Committee of the United Nations Committee on Non-Self-Governing Territories.

1956: President of the United Nations Committee on Non-Self-Governing Territories. (See United Nations list of non-self-governing territories.)

1957: Elected Chairman of the Political Affairs Commission and President of the Special Political Commission at the XII session of the United Nations General Assembly.

1957: Vice-President of the United Nations Trusteeship Council.

1958: President of the United Nations Trusteeship Council and President of the Group of Latin American Ambassadors before the United Nations.

1958-1966: Returned to Guatemala and engaged in private law practice until 1966, when he was appointed Foreign Minister of his country.

1968: President of the United Nations Twenty-Third General Assembly from 1968 to 1969.

References
United Nations biography

Biographical and Achievements information volunteered by Lucy Dorion, widow of Emilio Arenales, and posted by their grandson, Challen Willemsen (b. 1980).

Presidents of the United Nations General Assembly
1922 births
1969 deaths
People from Guatemala City
Permanent Representatives of Guatemala to the United Nations
Universidad de San Carlos de Guatemala alumni
Foreign ministers of Guatemala